John Ward, MC, (15 December 1918 – 29 August 1995) was a Flight Lieutenant in the Royal Air Force decorated twice for bravery. During World War II he was a member of a bomber crew shot down and taken POW but escaped and served as a BBC war correspondent behind enemy lines and fought with the Polish resistance Armia Krajowa (Home Army) participating in the Warsaw Uprising in occupied Poland being wounded in action against the SS controlled German forces.

Early life
Ward was born in December 1918 the Kings Norton district of Birmingham and grew up in the nearby suburb of Ward End where he was educated at the local council school.

Royal Air Force service
He joined the Royal Air Force (RAF) in 1937 aged 18, as an Aircraftman 2nd class, to train for aircrew as a wireless operator/air gunner and by 1939 was serving with No. 226 Squadron RAF based at RAF Upper Heyford. On 2 September 1939 the squadron was part of the RAF contingent which moved to France ready for war. Under the Advanced Air Striking Force it was based at Rheims.

Prisoner of war

Ward was an Aircraftman 1st class and member of the crew of a No. 226 Squadron RAF Fairey Battle light bomber (serial number "K9183") on 10 May 1940 when it was shot down by the Luftwaffe during the Fall of France.

Tasked to bomb German troop convoys as they advanced south-west of Luxemburg, four aircraft from the squadron took off at 17:00 hours GMT from Rheims, Champagne. After locating a column of 30 to 40 vehicles they made several dive bombing attacks in the face of heavy defensive fire. They suffered one aircraft shot down in flames (K9183) and another which crashed after being badly shot up. All three crew of Ward's crew were taken prisoner wounded, although the fatally injured pilot died three days later.

Ward was captured and held as a prisoner of war. He was at Stalag Luft I near Barth, Western Pomerania in December 1940 before being moved to an unnamed labour camp in Upper Silesia in January 1941. At the end of March 1941 he was sent to a labour camp near Lissa in Poland.

Escape and the Polish resistance

On 17 April 1941, Ward was with a working party of twenty prisoners supervised by two German soldiers when he hid, changed into civilian clothes and escaped. At Gostyn he was arrested in the railway marshalling yards and taken to the police station where he escaped through a window at night. In six days Ward travelled to Sieradz where he was directed to the local Roman Catholic priest who provided an introduction to the Polish Home Army. On 30 April 1941, he was taken by train to Lodz. At the end of May Ward was taken by bus to Warsaw. The plan had been to get Ward across the border to the Soviet Union but when the Germans invaded it in June 1941 that became impractical. Ward met Otto Gordzialowski, a lawyer who ran an underground newspaper called Dzien, and worked for him transcribing British Broadcasting Company (BBC) radio broadcasts for translation into Polish for the newspaper. In September 1941, the Gestapo located the newspaper and captured the printers and distributors but failed to catch Gordzialowski or Ward. During 1942 Ward began to build wireless receivers and transmitters which were supplied to Polish resistance groups. In June 1942, he opened his own newspaper, the Echo, and after building it up passed it to the ZWZ organisation in February 1943. During this period he trained a number of Poles as radio operators.

Operating with the Polish resistance, he was tasked with facilitating communication between the British government and the Polish underground. From 1941 to 1945 Ward was the communications liaison between the British government and the Armia Krajowa (Polish Home Army); he also worked as a war correspondent for the London Times including over two years in occupied Warsaw.

Warsaw uprising

He joined the Polish Resistance in August 1944 when the Warsaw Uprising broke out and was recruited by Stefan and Zofia Korbonski to prepare English dispatches that were transmitted to London via Morse Code. He prepared 64 eyewitness reports of the fighting as a war correspondent (behind enemy lines) for London's The Times. Ward participated in the clandestine activities of the Polish resistance movement's "Błyskawica" (Lighting) radio station during the uprising, airing the English-language broadcasts, in addition to contributing over 100 reports. He spoke Polish with a heavy accent. Despite the risk of execution if he was captured Ward wore the red and white armband and the Polish cap eagle of the Polish Home Army. He was wounded in action in the thigh by mortar shrapnel; the Polish force decorated him with the Cross of Valour for his bravery, awarded personally by General Tadeusz Bór-Komorowski.

Ward fought with the Polish resistance after the uprising until the end of the war and continued to be promoted by the Royal Air Force on a regular basis achieving the rank of Warrant Officer. Ward was promoted to commissioned rank in the Polish Home Army and General Bor-Komorowski arranged for his movement from Warsaw to Kielce for evacuation by air as the uprising ended on 4 October 1944 with the Polish Home Army survivors going into German captivity. He maintained contact with Major Michael Pickles, the Head of SOE Polish Section.

After the uprising
Ward left Warsaw heading for Częstochowa and Kielce but his train was stopped by German police and posing as a Pole he was sent back to Czestochowa labour concentration camp. Ward escaped from Czestochowa with help from a German guard bribed with US dollars and joined the 7th Polish Partisan Division serving with them until December 1944. He travelled to Raszków and avoided the initial wave of Soviet Red Army troops who committed serious atrocities on the Polish civil population on 18 January 1945, arresting all educated Poles and anyone suspected of being with the Polish Home Army.  On 20 January 1945, a Soviet NKVD Secret Police officer questioned Ward having learned that he was English. He was ordered not to move but on 1 February 1945 with Mrs Gordzialowski he travelled to Kielce where he sent a radio message to London and then continued on to Podkowa Leśna where he contacted General Leopold Okulicki "Kobra" (Cobra), then head of the Polish Home Army.  Ward returned to Warsaw on 5 March 1945 and reported to the Soviet occupation commandant but was immediately arrested, interrogated and put in a cell. On the morning of 6 March 1945 Ward left his cell pretending to be an official and after speaking to the guard in fluent Russian, walked away. Some Frenchmen directed him to an American captain who provided assistance. Ward joined a party of British and American former prisoners of war for repatriation, bound for Odessa. He sailed from there aboard the Duchess of Bedford on 14 March 1945.

For his continued bravery serving with the Polish Home Army he was awarded the Military Cross, and the Krzyż Walecznych. His detailed despatches are available online.

Post-war
Ward was commissioned Pilot Officer in the Admin and Special Duties Branch of the Royal Air Force on 1 January 1946, and from 1 July 1946 held the rank of Flying Officer. He was promoted Flying Officer on 1 November 1947.

He died on 29 August 1995 in London.

Awards
 Military Cross awarded on 31 August 1945 as Warrant Officer (service number 542939) Royal Air Force formerly of No. 226 Squadron RAF.
 Krzyż Walecznych Polish Cross of Valour.

See also
 Błyskawica radiostation

References

Bibliography

External links
 Kamil Tchorek, Escaped British Airman Was Hero of Warsaw Uprising, Reprinted from 1 August 2004, Times Online, on the pages of Warsaw Uprising Museum
 Short bio, recorded transmissions

1918 births
1995 deaths
British escapees
British World War II prisoners of war
Military personnel from Birmingham, West Midlands
Royal Air Force officers
Royal Air Force personnel of World War II
Warsaw Uprising insurgents
World War II prisoners of war held by Germany
Recipients of the Military Cross